This article contains a complete list of Michelin starred restaurants in Washington, D.C. since 2017. The D.C. guide is the first US Michelin Guide released since the Chicago guide in 2011. It is the fourth US guide after New York City, San Francisco, and Chicago. Although originally stating that all restaurants would be within the city limits, Michelin awarded stars to The Inn at Little Washington, which is in Virginia.

Alphabetic list

References

External links
Michelin Guide - Washington, D.C.

Lists of restaurants
Washington, DC
 Michelin
Washington, D.C.-related lists